Amazing Grace: His Greatest Sacred Performances is a two-disc compilation of studio master recordings by Elvis Presley,  released in 1994 on RCA Records and certified double platinum by the RIAA on July 15, 1999. The release also includes a booklet with session details and an essay by Charles Wolfe.

Contents
The set, catalogued as number 66421-2,   comprises recordings of gospel music made by Presley during his career. The contents of all three gospel albums Presley released in his lifetime are included, while other songs had appeared on singles, an extended play single, and other albums. The set also contains five previously unreleased selections, and the two discs present the studio masters in chronological session order.

Disc one contains the entirety of his two albums released respectively in 1960 and 1967, His Hand In Mine and How Great Thou Art. The other five tracks contain the four-song EP Peace in the Valley from 1957, incorporated later that year into his first Christmas album, and the 1965 hit single "Crying in the Chapel" which reached No. 3 on the Billboard Hot 100 and was added as the final track to the 1967 album.

Disc two contains the entirety of his 1972 album He Touched Me, with the five previously unreleased selections derived from a jam session captured on March 31, 1972, during the filming for Elvis on Tour. The songs "You'll Never Walk Alone" and "We Call On Him" were released as two sides of a single in time for Easter in 1968, and "Only Believe" and "Help Me" appeared as b-sides of singles in the 1970s but were excluded from the 1970s box set discs compiling his complete singles from that decade. The remaining five tracks appeared on Presley albums released during the 1970s, the songs "How Great Thou Art" and "Why Me Lord" being concert recordings.

This set accompanied RCA's mid-1990s compilation reissue program for Elvis Presley, including the five-disc box sets The King of Rock 'n' Roll: The Complete 50's Masters, From Nashville to Memphis: The Essential 60's Masters, Walk a Mile in My Shoes: The Essential 70's Masters, and the two-disc set anthologizing his 1960s soundtrack recordings, Command Performances: The Essential 60's Masters II. These nineteen compact discs, containing 507 recordings in total, constitute a substantial percentage of Presley's career output.

All selections recorded at Radio Recorders in Hollywood, RCA Studio B in Nashville, Tennessee, the Stax Recording Studio and the Mid-South Coliseum in Memphis, Tennessee. Unknown location for the March 1972 jam session. Original recordings produced by Steve Sholes or Felton Jarvis. Discographical information taken from Elvis Presley A Life in Music by Ernst Jorgensen.

Track listing

Personnel

 Elvis Presley – vocals, guitar, piano
 The Jordanaires – vocals
 The Imperials – vocals
 The Sweet Inspirations – vocals
 The Nashville Edition – vocals
 J.D. Sumner and the Stamps – vocals
 Tim Baty – vocals
 Charlie Hodge – vocals, guitar
 Millie Kirkham – vocals
 Sherrill Nielsen – vocals
 Donnie Sumner – vocals
 Kathy Westmoreland – vocals
 Dolores Edgin – backing vocals
 Mary Greene – backing vocals
 Ginger Holladay – backing vocals
 Mary Holladay – backing vocals
 Sonja Montgomery – backing vocals
 June Page – backing vocals
 Susan Pilkington – backing vocals
 Temple Riser – backing vocals
 Henry Slaughter – backing vocals, keyboards
 Boots Randolph – saxophone
 Pete Drake – pedal steel guitar
 Harold Bradley – electric guitar
 James Burton – electric guitar
 Johnny Christopher – electric guitar
 Hank Garland – electric guitar
 Scotty Moore – electric guitar
 Chip Young – electric guitar
 John Wilkinson – electric guitar
 David Briggs – keyboards
 Floyd Cramer – piano
 Glen D. Hardin – piano
 Joe Moscheo – piano
 Gordon Stoker – piano
 Hoyt Hawkins – organ
 Charlie McCoy – organ, bass
 Glen Spreen – organ
 Duke Bardwell – bass
 Bill Black – bass
 Bob Moore – bass
 Norbert Putnam – bass
 Kenny Buttrey – drums
 Jerry Carrigan – drums, percussion
 D.J. Fontana – drums
 Buddy Harman – drums
 Ronnie Tutt – drums

References

Elvis Presley compilation albums
1994 compilation albums
RCA Records compilation albums
Compilation albums published posthumously